Azul Tequila is a Mexican telenovela. The 160-episode serial was produced for TV Azteca by the celebrity couple Christian Bach and Humberto Zurita in conjunction with Humberto's brother Gerardo through their production company ZUBA Producciones. The complete series has been released in an 8 DVD box set.

Plot
Azul is a young woman in the end of the 19th century who has been forced to get engaged to Arcadio Berriozabal when she is in love with his brother Santiago Berriozabal. Before her wedding peasant revolution is started and she is kidnapped. Santiago, believing she is dead, creates one of the finest tequilas and calls it "Azul Tequila".

Cast
 Bárbara Mori as Azul / Soledad
 Mauricio Ochmann as Santiago Berriozabal
 Víctor González as Arcadio Berriozabal
 Rogelio Guerra as Adolfo Berriozabal
 Leonardo Daniel as Mariano
 Fabiola Campomanes as Lorenza
 Úrsula Prats as Hilda
 Lorena Rojas as Catalina

Reception
With an approximate cost of $5,000,000 United States dollars, this production was praised by the critics, but was  a great success with the Mexican audience although it was in Europe, Asia, Malaysia, and Thailand. , the most successful telenovela . This was the first telenovela for Ursula Pratts with TV Azteca, and also the first in 10 years after Monte Calvario in 1988.

References

External links
 

1998 telenovelas
1998 Mexican television series debuts
1998 Mexican television series endings
Mexican telenovelas
TV Azteca telenovelas
Spanish-language telenovelas